Soul on West 53rd is the sixth studio album by Australian singer Ian Moss. The album was released in October 2009 and peaked at number 40 on the ARIA Charts, becoming Moss's second top 40 album.

Reception
Amazon said "Respected as one of Australia's iconic musicians, Ian Moss delivers an unforgettable sound - not only as a telling soloist on guitar but especially with his silken voice, ringing with clarity and resonating with pure soul. 'Mossy' is now allowing his guitar work to take a back seat while he concentrates on singing - which is the focus of his album that features fresh takes on classic soul songs from the likes of Sam Cooke, Al Green, Otis Redding and Levi Stubbs. When audiences hear the power and excitement on Soul on West 53rd, it will reinforce what Ian Moss has to offer as a vocalist of repute".

Track listing

Charts

Release history

References 

2009 albums
Covers albums
Ian Moss albums
Albums produced by Danny Kortchmar
Liberation Records albums